Mati, Nepal  is a village in Bhimeshwor municipality,  Dolakha District in the Janakpur Zone of north-eastern Nepal. At the time of the 1991 Nepal census it had a population of 4,264 people living in 886 individual households. Currently Ram Best is the ward chief of this village.

References

External links
UN map of the municipalities of Dolakha District

Populated places in Dolakha District